Promine Inc. is a company which produces a self-titled software used for mining engineering and geological work. Promine functions as an extension of AutoDesk's AutoCAD software, providing additional functionality specifically oriented for work in the mining industry. Promine uses the native 3-Dimensional aspect of CAD software to enable users to produce functional models of working, planned or past mines. Though focused on development of underground mines, Promine also supports above ground (open pit) mining as well as strictly geological work.

History

Promine was founded as Yvan Dionne Inc, by the company's founder and President Yvan Dionne over twenty years ago in Quebec, Canada. The incorporation was warranted due to the large number of functions he had developed on contract which together made a de facto software suite. After deciding on the company name, Promine, the company was reincorporated as Promine Inc. The company today stands at approximately 10 employees and has two separate branches, the Montreal office specializing in Marketing, sales and business development and the Quebec City office specializing in software development.

Areas of operation

Promine is available in English, French and Spanish, natively. The evolution of supported languages has followed the evolution of the company's client base. Promine was founded in Quebec, Canada, where the official language is French, and so too was the first language of the software. As clients from other Canadian provinces got the software, the need for an English version was satisfied. Finally, after much expansion into Canada and the United States the company began to make inroads into Latin America, eventually providing full Spanish translations. The company has clients in French-speaking Africa and several consultants in Europe use the software as well.

References

 http://metals-mining.cioreview.com/vendor/2015/promine
 http://www.energy-executive.com/features/contributing-writers/205-the-new-era-of-mining

Software companies of Canada
Science software for Windows
Geology software